Reynir Gísli Karlsson (27 February 1934 – 12 November 2014) was an Icelandic football manager and player. He managed the Icelandic men's national football team in 1967.

Playing career
A defender, Reynir played for Fram from 1950 to 1958. He played three matches for the Iceland national team from 1956 to 1957.

Managerial career
Reynir was the manager of several clubs in Iceland, including Fram, ÍBA, Keflavík, and Breiðablik.

Titles
 1. deild karla1: 1970
1 The league was named 2. deild karla from 1955 to 1996

Personal life
Reynir was married to Svanfríður Guðjónsdóttir, the first woman to be a member of the board of Football Association of Iceland. Their daughter, Ásta María Reynisdóttir, was a key player for the Breiðablik team that won 11 national championships and 4 Icelandic Cups from 1977 to 1995. Their son, Guðjón Karl Reynisson, played football for Breiðablik men's team and later managed the women's team.

References

External links

1934 births
2014 deaths
Reynir Karlsson
Reynir Karlsson
Association football defenders
Reynir Karlsson
Reynir Karlsson
Reynir Karlsson
Reynir Karlsson
Reynir Karlsson